In algebra, a cubic equation in one variable is an equation of the form

The solutions of this equation are called roots of the cubic function defined by the left-hand side of the equation. All of the roots of the cubic equation can be found by the following means:

 algebraically, that is, they can be expressed by a cubic formula involving the four coefficients, the four basic arithmetic operations and th roots (radicals). (This is also true of quadratic (second-degree) and quartic (fourth-degree) equations, but not of higher-degree equations, by the Abel–Ruffini theorem.)
 trigonometrically 
 numerical approximations of the roots can be found using root-finding algorithms such as Newton's method.

The coefficients do not need to be real numbers. Much of what is covered below is valid for coefficients in any field with characteristic other than 2 and 3. The solutions of the cubic equation do not necessarily belong to the same field as the coefficients. For example, some cubic equations with rational coefficients have roots that are irrational (and even non-real) complex numbers.

History

Cubic equations were known to the ancient Babylonians, Greeks, Chinese, Indians, and Egyptians. Babylonian (20th to 16th centuries BC) cuneiform tablets have been found with tables for calculating cubes and cube roots. The Babylonians could have used the tables to solve cubic equations, but no evidence exists to confirm that they did. The problem of doubling the cube involves the simplest and oldest studied cubic equation, and one for which the ancient Egyptians did not believe a solution existed. In the 5th century BC, Hippocrates reduced this problem to that of finding two mean proportionals between one line and another of twice its length, but could not solve this with a compass and straightedge construction, a task which is now known to be impossible. Methods for solving cubic equations appear in The Nine Chapters on the Mathematical Art, a Chinese mathematical text compiled around the 2nd century BC and commented on by Liu Hui in the 3rd century. In the 3rd century AD, the Greek mathematician Diophantus found integer or rational solutions for some bivariate cubic equations (Diophantine equations). Hippocrates, Menaechmus and Archimedes are believed to have come close to solving the problem of doubling the cube using intersecting conic sections, though historians such as Reviel Netz dispute whether the Greeks were thinking about cubic equations or just problems that can lead to cubic equations. Some others like T. L. Heath, who translated all of Archimedes' works, disagree, putting forward evidence that Archimedes really solved cubic equations using intersections of two conics, but also discussed the conditions where the roots are 0, 1 or 2. 

In the 11th century, the Persian poet-mathematician, Omar Khayyam (1048–1131), made significant progress in the theory of cubic equations. In an early paper, he discovered that a cubic equation can have more than one solution and stated that it cannot be solved using compass and straightedge constructions. He also found a geometric solution. In his later work, the Treatise on Demonstration of Problems of Algebra, he wrote a complete classification of cubic equations with general geometric solutions found by means of intersecting conic sections.

In the 12th century, the Indian mathematician Bhaskara II attempted the solution of cubic equations without general success. However, he gave one example of a cubic equation: . In the 12th century, another Persian mathematician, Sharaf al-Dīn al-Tūsī (1135–1213), wrote the Al-Muʿādalāt (Treatise on Equations), which dealt with eight types of cubic equations with positive solutions and five types of cubic equations which may not have positive solutions. He used what would later be known as the "Ruffini-Horner method" to numerically approximate the root of a cubic equation. He also used the concepts of maxima and minima of curves in order to solve cubic equations which may not have positive solutions. He understood the importance of the discriminant of the cubic equation to find algebraic solutions to certain types of cubic equations.

In his book Flos, Leonardo de Pisa, also known as Fibonacci (1170–1250), was able to closely approximate the positive solution to the cubic equation . Writing in  Babylonian numerals he gave the result as 1,22,7,42,33,4,40 (equivalent to 1 + 22/60 + 7/602 + 42/603 + 33/604 + 4/605 + 40/606), which has a relative error of about 10−9.

In the early 16th century, the Italian mathematician Scipione del Ferro (1465–1526) found a method for solving a class of cubic equations, namely those of the form . Del Ferro kept his achievement secret until just before his death, when he told his student Antonio Fior about it.

In 1535, Niccolò Tartaglia (1500–1557) received two problems in cubic equations from Zuanne da Coi and announced that he could solve them. He was soon challenged by Fior, which led to a famous contest between the two. Each contestant had to put up a certain amount of money and to propose a number of problems for his rival to solve. Whoever solved more problems within 30 days would get all the money. Tartaglia received questions in the form , for which he had worked out a general method. Fior received questions in the form , which proved to be too difficult for him to solve, and Tartaglia won the contest.

Later, Tartaglia was persuaded by Gerolamo Cardano (1501–1576) to reveal his secret for solving cubic equations. In 1539, Tartaglia did so only on the condition that Cardano would never reveal it and that if he did write a book about cubics, he would give Tartaglia time to publish. Some years later, Cardano learned about del Ferro's prior work and published del Ferro's method in his book Ars Magna in 1545, meaning Cardano gave Tartaglia six years to publish his results (with credit given to Tartaglia for an independent solution). Cardano's promise to Tartaglia said that he would not publish Tartaglia's work, and Cardano felt he was publishing del Ferro's, so as to get around the promise. Nevertheless, this led to a challenge to Cardano from Tartaglia, which Cardano denied. The challenge was eventually accepted by Cardano's student Lodovico Ferrari (1522–1565). Ferrari did better than Tartaglia in the competition, and Tartaglia lost both his prestige and his income.

Cardano noticed that Tartaglia's method sometimes required him to extract the square root of a negative number. He even included a calculation with these complex numbers in Ars Magna, but he did not really understand it. Rafael Bombelli studied this issue in detail and is therefore often considered as the discoverer of complex numbers.

François Viète (1540–1603) independently derived the trigonometric solution for the cubic with three real roots, and René Descartes (1596–1650) extended the work of Viète.

Factorization

If the coefficients of a cubic equation are rational numbers, one can obtain an equivalent equation with integer coefficients, by multiplying all coefficients by a common multiple of their denominators. Such an equation 

with integer coefficients, is said to be reducible if the polynomial on the left-hand side is the product of polynomials of lower degrees. By Gauss's lemma, if the equation is reducible, one can suppose that the factors have integer coefficients.

Finding the roots of a reducible cubic equation is easier than solving the general case. In fact, if the equation is reducible, one of the factors must have degree one, and thus have the form

This other factor is 

(The coefficients seem not to be integers, but must be integers if  is a root.)

Then, the other roots are the roots of this quadratic polynomial and can be found by using the quadratic formula.

Depressed cubic
Cubics of the form 

are said to be depressed. They are much simpler than general cubics, but are fundamental, because the study of any cubic may be reduced by a simple change of variable to that of a depressed cubic.

Let 

be a cubic equation. The  change of variable

After dividing by  one gets the depressed cubic equation 

with 

The roots  of the original equation are related to the roots  of the depressed equation by the relations 

Discriminant and nature of the roots
The nature (real or not, distinct or not) of the roots of a cubic can be determined without computing them explicitly, by using the discriminant.

Discriminant
The discriminant of a polynomial is a function of its coefficients that is zero if and only if the polynomial has a multiple root,  or, if it is divisible by the square of a non-constant polynomial. In other words, the discriminant is nonzero if and only if the polynomial is square-free.

If  are the three roots (not necessarily distinct nor real) of the cubic  then the discriminant is

The discriminant of the depressed cubic  is 

The discriminant of the general cubic  is 

Using the formula relating the general cubic and the associated depressed cubic, this implies that the discriminant of the general cubic can be written as 

It follows that one of these two discriminants is zero if and only if the other is also zero, and, if the coefficients are real, the two discriminants have the same sign. In summary, the same information can be deduced from either one of these two discriminants.

The proof then results in the verification of the equality of two polynomials.

Nature of the roots
If the coefficients of a polynomial are real numbers, and its discriminant  is not zero, there are two cases:
If  the cubic has three distinct real roots
If  the cubic has one real root and two non-real complex conjugate roots.

This can be proved as follows. First, if  is a root of a polynomial with real coefficients, then its complex conjugate is also a root. So the non-real roots, if any, occur as pairs of complex conjugate roots. As a cubic polynomial has three roots (not necessarily distinct) by the fundamental theorem of algebra, at least one root must be real.

As stated above, if  are the three roots of the cubic , then the discriminant is 

If the three roots are real and distinct, the discriminant is a product of positive reals, that is 

Thus the discriminant is the product of a single negative number and several positive ones. That is

Multiple root
If the discriminant of a cubic is zero, the cubic has a multiple root. If furthermore its coefficients are real, then all of its roots are real.

The discriminant of the depressed cubic  is zero if  If  is also zero, then , and 0 is a triple root of the cubic.

and a double root

In other words,

This result can be proved by expanding the latter product or retrieved by solving the rather simple system of equations resulting from Vieta's formulas.

By using the reduction of a depressed cubic, these results can be extended to the general cubic. This gives: If the discriminant of the cubic  is zero, then

either, if  the cubic has a triple root

and

or, if  the cubic has a double root 

and a simple root,

and thus

Characteristic 2 and 3
The above results are valid when the coefficients belong to a field of characteristic other than 2 or 3, but must be modified for characteristic 2 or 3, because of the involved divisions by 2 and 3.

The reduction to a depressed cubic works for characteristic 2, but not for characteristic 3. However, in both cases, it is simpler to establish and state the results for the general cubic. The main tool for that is the fact that a multiple root is a common root of the polynomial and its formal derivative. In these characteristics, if the derivative is not a constant, it is a linear polynomial in characteristic 3, and is the square of a linear polynomial in characteristic 2. Therefore, for either characteristic 2 or 3, the derivative has only one root. This allows computing the multiple root, and the third root can be deduced from the sum of the roots, which is provided by Vieta's formulas.

A difference with other characteristics is that, in characteristic 2, the formula for a double root involves a square root, and, in characteristic 3, the formula for a triple root involves a cube root.

Cardano's formula

Gerolamo Cardano is credited with publishing the first formula for solving cubic equations, attributing it to Scipione del Ferro and Niccolo Fontana Tartaglia.

Cardano's result is that, if 

See , below, for several methods for getting this result.

If  there are three real roots, but Galois theory allows proving that, if there is no rational root, the roots cannot be expressed by an algebraic expression involving only real numbers. Therefore, the equation cannot be solved in this case with the knowledge of Cardano's time. This case has thus been called casus irreducibilis, meaning irreducible case in Latin.

In casus irreducibilis, Cardano's formula can still be used, but some care is needed in the use of cube roots. With this convention Cardano's formula for the three roots remains valid, but is not purely algebraic, as the definition of a principal part is not purely algebraic, since it involves inequalities for comparing real parts. Also, the use of principal cube root may give a wrong result if the coefficients are non-real complex numbers. Moreover, if the coefficients belong to another field, the principal cube root is not defined in general.

The second way for making Cardano's formula always correct, is to remark that the product of the two cube roots must be . It results that a root of the equation is 

In this formula, the symbols  and  denote any square root and any cube root. The other roots of the equation are obtained either by changing of cube root or, equivalently, by multiplying the cube root by a primitive cube root of unity, that is 

This formula for the roots is always correct except when , with the proviso that if , the square root is chosen so that . However, the formula is useless in these cases as the roots can be expressed without any cube root. Similarly, the formula is also useless in the other cases where no cube root is needed, that is when  and when the cubic polynomial is not irreducible.

This formula is also correct when  and  belong to any field of characteristic other than 2 or 3.

General cubic formula
A cubic formula for the roots of the general cubic equation (with )

can be deduced from every variant of Cardano's formula by reduction to a depressed cubic. The variant that is presented here is valid not only for real coefficients, but also for coefficients  belonging to any field of characteristic different of 2 and 3.

The formula being rather complicated, it is worth splitting it in smaller formulas.

Let

Then let

The sign "" before the square root is either "" or ""; the choice is almost arbitrary, and changing it amounts to choosing a different square root. However, if a choice yields  (this occurs if ), then the other sign must be selected instead. If both choices yield , that is, if  a fraction  occurs in following formulas; this fraction must be interpreted as equal to zero (see the end of this section).
With these conventions, one of the roots is

In other words, the three roots are 

where .

As for the special case of a depressed cubic, this formula applies but is useless when the roots can be expressed without cube roots. In particular, if  the formula gives that the three roots equal  which means that the cubic polynomial can be factored as  A straightforward computation allows verifying that the existence of this factorization is equivalent with

Trigonometric and hyperbolic solutions

Trigonometric solution for three real roots
When a cubic equation with real coefficients has three real roots, the formulas expressing these roots in terms of radicals involve complex numbers. Galois theory allows proving that when the three roots are real, and none is rational (casus irreducibilis), one cannot express the roots in terms of real radicals. Nevertheless, purely real expressions of the solutions may be obtained using trigonometric functions, specifically in terms of cosines and arccosines. More precisely, the roots of the depressed cubic

are 

This formula is due to François Viète. It is purely real when the equation has three real roots (that is ). Otherwise, it is still correct but involves complex cosines and arccosines when there is only one real root, and it is nonsensical (division by zero) when .

The formula can be proved as follows: Starting from the equation , let us set  The idea is to choose  to make the equation coincide with the identity

For this, choose  and divide the equation by  This gives 

Combining with the above identity, one gets 

and the roots are thus

Hyperbolic solution for one real root

When there is only one real root (and ), this root can be similarly represented using hyperbolic functions, as 

If  and the inequalities on the right are not satisfied (the case of three real roots), the formulas remain valid but involve complex quantities.

More precisely, the values involving cosines and hyperbolic cosines define, when , the same analytic function denoted , which is the proper Chebyshev cube root. The value involving hyperbolic sines is similarly denoted , when .

Geometric solutions

Omar Khayyám's solution
 
For solving the cubic equation  where , Omar Khayyám constructed the parabola , the circle that has as a diameter the line segment  on the positive -axis, and a vertical line through the point where the circle and the parabola intersect above the -axis. The solution is given by the length of the horizontal line segment from the origin to the intersection of the vertical line and the -axis (see the figure).

A simple modern proof is as follows.

Solution with angle trisector
A cubic equation with real coefficients can be solved geometrically using compass, straightedge, and an angle trisector if and only if it has three real roots.

A cubic equation can be solved by compass-and-straightedge construction (without trisector) if and only if it has a rational root. This implies that the old problems of angle trisection and doubling the cube, set by ancient Greek mathematicians, cannot be solved by compass-and-straightedge construction.

Geometric interpretation of the roots

Three real roots

Viète's trigonometric expression of the roots in the three-real-roots case lends itself to a geometric interpretation in terms of a circle. When the cubic is written in depressed form, as shown above, the solution can be expressed as

Here  is an angle in the unit circle; taking  of that angle corresponds to taking a cube root of a complex number; adding  for  finds the other cube roots; and multiplying the cosines of these resulting angles by  corrects for scale.

For the non-depressed case (shown in the accompanying graph), the depressed case as indicated previously is obtained by defining  such that  so . This shift moves the point of inflection and the centre of the circle onto the -axis. Consequently, the roots of the equation in  sum to zero.

One real root

In the Cartesian plane

When the graph of a cubic function is plotted in the Cartesian plane, if there is only one real root, it is the abscissa (-coordinate) of the horizontal intercept of the curve (point R on the figure). The imaginary parts  are the square roots of the tangent of the angle between this tangent line and the horizontal axis.

In the complex plane

With one real and two complex roots, the three roots can be represented as points in the complex plane, as can the two roots of the cubic's derivative. There is an interesting geometrical relationship among all these roots.

The points in the complex plane representing the three roots serve as the vertices of an isosceles triangle. (The triangle is isosceles because one root is on the horizontal (real) axis and the other two roots, being complex conjugates, appear symmetrically above and below the real axis.) Marden's theorem says that the points representing the roots of the derivative of the cubic are the foci of the Steiner inellipse of the triangle—the unique ellipse that is tangent to the triangle at the midpoints of its sides. If the angle at the vertex on the real axis is less than  then the major axis of the ellipse lies on the real axis, as do its foci and hence the roots of the derivative.

Galois group

As these automorphisms must permute the roots of the polynomials, this group is either the group  of all six permutations of the three roots, or the group  of the three circular permutations.

The discriminant  of the cubic is the square of 

As  changes of sign if two roots are exchanged,  is fixed by the Galois group only if the Galois group is 
.

As most integers are not squares, when working over the field  of the rational numbers, the Galois group of most irreducible cubic polynomials is the group  with six elements.

Derivation of the roots

This section regroups several methods for deriving Cardano's formula.

Cardano's method
This method is due to Scipione del Ferro and Tartaglia, but is named after Gerolamo Cardano who first published it in his book Ars Magna (1545).

This method applies to a depressed cubic . The idea is to introduce two variables  and  such that  and to substitute this in the depressed cubic, giving

At this point Cardano imposed the condition . This removes the third term in previous  equality, leading to the system of equations

 
so

So (without loss of generality in choosing u or v):

As , the sum of the cube roots of these solutions is a root of the equation. That is 

is a root of the equation; this is Cardano's formula.

This works well when  but, if  the square root appearing in the formula is not real. As a complex number has three cube roots, using Cardano's formula without care would provide nine roots, while a cubic equation cannot have more than three roots. This was clarified first by Rafael Bombelli in his book L'Algebra (1572).

The other roots of the equation can be obtained by changing of cube root, or, equivalently, by multiplying the cube root by each of the two primitive cube roots of unity, which are

Vieta's substitution 

The substitution  transforms the depressed cubic into

Let 
 
be any nonzero root of this quadratic equation.

Lagrange's method
In his paper Réflexions sur la résolution algébrique des équations ("Thoughts on the algebraic solving of equations"), Joseph Louis Lagrange introduced a new method to solve equations of low degree in a uniform way, with the hope that he could generalize it for higher degrees. This method works well for cubic and quartic equations, but Lagrange did not succeed in applying it to a quintic equation, because it requires solving a resolvent polynomial of degree at least six. 
Except that nobody succeeded before to solve the problem, this was the first indication of the non-existence of an algebraic formula for degrees 5 and higher; this was later proved as the Abel–Ruffini theorem. Nevertheless, the modern methods for solving solvable quintic equations are mainly based on Lagrange's method.

In the case of cubic equations, Lagrange's method gives the same solution as Cardano's. Lagrange's method can be applied directly to the general cubic equation  , but the computation is simpler with the depressed cubic equation, .

Lagrange's main idea was to work with the discrete Fourier transform of the roots instead of with the roots themselves. Denoting ,  and  the three roots of the cubic equation to be solved, let

be the discrete Fourier transform of the roots.

So, only  and  need to be computed. This is the reason for which Lagrange's method fails in degrees five and higher.

A straightforward computation using the relations  and  gives 

Using Newton's identities, it is straightforward to express them in terms of the elementary symmetric functions of the roots, giving

Applications

Cubic equations arise in various other contexts.

In mathematics 
 Angle trisection and doubling the cube are two ancient problems of geometry that have been proved to not be solvable  by straightedge and compass construction, because they are equivalent to solving a cubic equation.
 Marden's theorem states that the foci of the Steiner inellipse of any triangle can be found by using the cubic function whose roots are the coordinates in the complex plane of the triangle's three vertices. The roots of the first derivative of this cubic are the complex coordinates of those foci.
 The area of a regular heptagon can be expressed in terms of the roots of a cubic. Further, the ratios of the long diagonal to the side, the side to the short diagonal, and the negative of the short diagonal to the long diagonal all satisfy a particular cubic equation. In addition, the ratio of the inradius to the circumradius of a heptagonal triangle is one of the solutions of a cubic equation. The values of trigonometric functions of angles related to  satisfy cubic equations.
 Given the cosine (or other trigonometric function) of an arbitrary angle, the cosine of one-third of that angle is one of the roots of a cubic.
 The solution of the general quartic equation relies on the solution of its resolvent cubic.
 The eigenvalues of a 3×3 matrix are the roots of a cubic polynomial which is the characteristic polynomial of the matrix.
 The characteristic equation of a third-order constant coefficients or Cauchy–Euler (equidimensional variable coefficients) linear differential equation or difference equation is a cubic equation.
 Intersection points of cubic Bézier curve and straight line can be computed using direct cubic equation representing Bézier curve.
Critical points of a quartic function are found by solving a cubic equation (the derivative set equal to zero).
Inflection points of a quintic function are the solution of a cubic equation (the second derivative set equal to zero).

In other sciences 
 In analytical chemistry, the Charlot equation, which can be used to find the pH of buffer solutions, can be solved using a cubic equation.
 In thermodynamics, equations of state (which relate pressure, volume, and temperature of a substances), e.g. the Van der Waals equation of state, are cubic in the volume.
 Kinematic equations involving linear rates of acceleration are cubic.
 The speed of seismic Rayleigh waves is a solution of the Rayleigh wave cubic equation.
 The steady state speed of a vehicle moving on a slope with air friction for a given input power is solved by a depressed cubic equation.

Notes

References

Further reading
  Ch. 24.

External links
 
History of quadratic, cubic and quartic equations on MacTutor archive.
500 years of NOT teaching THE CUBIC FORMULA. What is it they think you can't handle? – YouTube video by  Mathologer about the history of cubic equations and Cardano's solution, as well as Ferrari's solution to quartic equations

Elementary algebra
Equations
Polynomials